The British Heavyweight Championship is a professional wrestling championship contested for in the XWA. The championship was originally created and contested for in the Frontier Wrestling Alliance (FWA) but moved to XWA when the former company became defunct. It has also been contested for in Ring of Honor (ROH) due to a working relationship between them and FWA.

History

The first Champion was Mark Sloan, who defeated Paul Glory in a tournament final on 11 July 1999. Jody Fleisch was the first person to win the belt twice after being stripped of it, while American wrestler Christopher Daniels was the first non-British person to win the belt and go on to defend it on foreign soil.

Originally the belt was mostly defended under two out of three falls match rules, as was the tradition in British wrestling. This changed on 12 April 2005, when champion Alex Shane signed a cast-iron contract to make new FWA British Title rules official and permanent making all future championship matches simply one fall.

On 13 May 2006 the FWA British Heavyweight Title belt was stolen from the Morecambe Dome immediately following the FWA event at the venue during an FWA versus All-Star Wrestling show. Due to being stolen a new belt had to be created. When the FWA was forced to retire in its interpromotional war with International Pro Wrestling: United Kingdom, the XWA carried the lineage of the championship simply renaming it the British Heavyweight Championship and using the same physical belt. However, in April 2009, XWA founder Greg Lambert announced the creation of a new British Heavyweight Championship that did not bear the FWA initials and gave the original belt back to Alex Shane in time for the resurrection of the FWA.

On 17 February 2018 Rhia O’Reilly became the first woman to hold the title, defeating Cara Noir in an inter-promotional show with Pro Wrestling: EVE.

Reigns

Combined reigns

See also

Professional wrestling in the United Kingdom

References

External links
 XWA British Heavyweight Championship
Frontier Wrestling Alliance championships
Heavyweight wrestling championships
National professional wrestling championships
Professional wrestling in the United Kingdom
National championships in the United Kingdom
XWA (professional wrestling)